Kriminalpolizei (English: Criminal Police), often abbreviated as Kripo, is the German name for a criminal investigation department.  This article deals with the agency during the Nazi era.

In Nazi Germany, the Kripo consisted of the Reich Criminal Police Department (RKPA), which in 1939 became Department V of the Reich Security Main Office (RSHA). There were criminal investigation centers directly subordinated to RKPA as well as criminal investigation divisions of the local state and municipal police departments. In 1943 both the latter became directly subordinated to the criminal investigation centers. The personnel consisted of detectives in the junior, executive, and female careers, as well as criminal investigation employees.

Organization 
After Adolf Hitler took office in January 1933, the Nazis began a programme of "coordination" of all aspects of German life, in order to consolidate the Nazi Party's hold on power. In July 1936, the Prussian central criminal investigation department (Landeskriminalpolizeiamt) became the central criminal investigation department for Germany, the Reichskriminalpolizeiamt (RKPA). It was combined, along with the secret state police, the Geheime Staatspolizei or Gestapo into two sub-branch departments of the Sicherheitspolizei (SiPo), which had a central command office known as the Hauptamt Sicherheitspolizei. Reinhard Heydrich was in overall command of the SiPo, including its central command office. Arthur Nebe was appointed head of the Reichskriminalpolizeiamt, and reported directly to Heydrich.

In September 1939, the Reichssicherheitshauptamt (Reich Security Main Office; RSHA) was created as the overarching command organization for the various state investigation and security agencies. The Hauptamt Sicherheitspolizei was officially abolished and its departments were folded into the Reich Main Security Office. The Reichskriminalpolizeiamt became Amt V (Department 5), the Kriminalpolizei (Criminal Police) in the RSHA. It was commanded by Nebe until the summer of 1944, when he was denounced and executed subsequent to the failed 20 July plot to kill Hitler. In the last year of its existence, Amt V was commanded by Friedrich Panzinger who answered directly to Ernst Kaltenbrunner, the head of the Reich Security Main Office after Heydrich's assassination in 1942.

The Kriminalpolizei mostly consisted of plainclothes detectives and agents, and worked in conjunction with the Gestapo, the Ordnungspolizei (Orpo; uniformed police) and the Geheime Feldpolizei. The policy directives came from the SS-Hauptamt (SS Main Office) and after 1940, the SS Führungshauptamt (SS Leadership Main Office). The Kripo was organized in a hierarchical system, with central offices in all towns and smaller cities. These, in turn, answered to headquarters offices in the larger German cities which answered to Amt V in Berlin.

The Kriminalpolizei was mainly concerned with serious crimes such as rape, murder and arson. A main area of the group's focus was also on "blackout burglary," considered a serious problem during bombing raids when criminals would raid abandoned homes, shops and factories for any available valuables. The Kripo was also one of the sources of manpower used to fill the ranks of the Einsatzgruppen when the units were re-formed prior to the invasion of the Soviet Union in 1941. Several senior Kripo commanders, Arthur Nebe among them, were assigned as Einsatzgruppen commanders. The Einsatzgruppen mobile death squad units perpetrated atrocities in the occupied Soviet Union, including mass murder of Jews, communists, prisoners of war, and hostages, and played a key role in the Holocaust.

As part of the Nazi doctrines on crime and race, the Rassenhygienische und Bevölkerungsbiologische Forschungsstelle headed by psychiatrist and medical doctor Robert Ritter, was attached to the Kripo. Its role was to create racial profiles of non-Aryans, in particular, Roma. Both the Gestapo and the Kripo deferred their policies and guidelines to the criminal biology department on how to deal with "Gypsies". The Kripo aided in the round ups of Roma and their deportations to concentration camps and extermination camps.

Mission 
The official mission of Amt V was to:
 Standardize criminological methods and equipment 
 Apply scientific research and experience in the investigation and prevention of crime
 Conduct criminological training
 Provide data for policy decisions and legislation
 Nationalize police surveillance
 Maintain a national criminal register
 Investigate severe crimes

Activities 
In 1945 Amt V had the following bureaus:

Field Organization

Field Organization 1939–1943

 Source:

Towns with over 10,000 residents having a municipal police department were obliged to have a municipal criminal investigation division (Gemeindekriminalpolizeiabteilung). It was supervised by the nearest Kripo-Stelle.

Field Organization 1943–1945
From 1943 all municipal criminal investigation divisions with over ten detectives, i.e. mainly in towns with over 50,000 inhabitants, were transferred to the state criminal police. Local state criminal investigations divisions were henceforth not subordinated to the local state police commissioner.

 Source:

In 1944 there were 22 Kripo-Leitstellen with 150-250 detectives under an Oberregierungs- und Kriminalrat; 44 Kripo-Stellen with 80-120 detectives under a Regierungs- und Kriminalrat or Kriminaldirektor; and 698 Kripo-Aussendienstellen and Kripo-Aussenpost, of which the latter per definition had less than ten detectives.

Personnel 
There were two separate criminal investigation officer careers: the junior criminal investigation career (einfacher Vollzugsdienst) and the executive criminal investigation career (leitender Vollzugsdienst). There were also a female criminal investigation career (weibliche Kriminalpolizei). In addition there were criminal investigation employees, who were salaried public employees but not civil servants.

Employment and training

Junior Criminal Investigation Career
A detective trainee had to be a policeman in the Ordnungspolizei or a soldier in the Waffen-SS with the rank of SS-Unterscharführer or above, having served at least 4 ½ years, and not be older than 24 years. The Kriminalassistentanwärter (detective trainee) began his training as an intern for 12 months, followed by a 12 months course at the Kriminalfachschule (Criminal investigation college) in Berlin-Charlottenburg. After the college came a 12 months period as probationary detective (Kriminalassistent aus Probe). First employment was as apl. Kriminalassistent (supernumerary detective) until a billet was free and he could be appointed to a permanent position as Kriminalassistent.

Executive Criminal Investigation Career
Externally recruited senior detective trainees (Kriminalkommissaranwärter) must have taken the general university entrance exam (Abitur) and been selected through a special selection procedure (Ausleselager). Internally recruited senior detective trainees came from the lower ranks of the Ordnungspolizei or from the junior criminal investigation career. They were selected through a civil service exam. The training began with a 12 months internship, followed by a 9 months course at the Führerschule der Sicherheitspolizei in Berlin-Charlottenburg. The trainee was then promoted to Hilfskriminalkommissar; normally he was within a few days given a six months probationary appointment as Kriminalkommissar auf Probe, before being promoted to außerplanmäßigen Kriminalkommissar as a supernumerary.

Female Criminal Investigation Career
According to regulations issued by the Reich Security Main Office in 1940, women that had been trained in social work or having a similar education could be hired as female detectives. Female youth leaders, lawyers, business administrators with experience in social work, female leaders in the Reichsarbeitsdienst and personnel administrators in the Bund Deutscher Mädel were hired as detectives after a one-year course if they had several years professional experience. Later also nurses, kindergarten teachers and trained female commercial employees with an aptitude for police work were hired as female detectives after a two-year course. After two years as Kriminaloberassistentin promotion to Kriminalsekretärin could take place, after another two or three years in that grade the female detective could be promoted to Kriminalobersekretärin. Further promotions to Kriminalkommissarin and Kriminalrätin was also possible.

Criminal Investigation Employees
Criminal Investigation Aids, from 1935 Criminal Investigation Employees, were salaried public employees but not civil servants. There were three kinds of Criminal Investigation Employees, Kriminalangesteller (A) in outer service, Kriminalangesteller (K) were drivers, Kriminalangesteller (F) were telex operators. The fact that Criminal Investigation Employees were not civil servants made it possible to recruit reliable members of the Nazi Party, irrespective of civil service regulations concerning employment requirements and regardless of budget plans. The only requirements that were made beyond the normal conditions for public employment in Nazi Germany was that the applicant  were physically and mentally fit for police duties. Not all Criminal Investigation Employees were volunteers; members of the Nazi Party and the Allgemeine SS could, after the beginning of the war in 1939, be conscripted into criminal police service. During the German occupation of Denmark, Danish citizens would also be employed as Kriminalangestellter, but with the Gestapo.

Pay
Criminal Investigation Officers' Rank and Pay

Mean annual pay for an industrial worker was 1,459 Reichsmark in 1939, and for a privately employed white-collar worker 2,772 Reichsmark.

Criminal Investigation Employees' Pay 
The Criminal Investigation Employees were not paid according to the Civil Service pay scale, but in accordance with the salary scale for public employees. They were later paid according to a special pay scale (see below):

Rank insignia
Male personnel

References

Citations

Bibliography
 
 
 
 
 
 
 

Police units of Nazi Germany
Reich Security Main Office